Awarua River may refer to:

 Awarua River (Northland), New Zealand
 Awarua River (Southland), New Zealand
 Dry Awarua River, New Zealand